The 2017 UTEP Miners football team represented University of Texas at El Paso in the 2017 NCAA Division I FBS football season. The Miners played their home games at the Sun Bowl in El Paso, Texas and competed in the West Division of Conference USA (C–USA). They were led by fifth-year head coach Sean Kugler until his resignation on October 2 and then by interim head coach Mike Price, who had previously served at UTEP's head coach from 2004 to 2012. The Miners finished the season with a record , 0–8 in conference play to finish in last place in the Conference USA (7th in West Division) and winless for the first time since the 1973 season. UTEP averaged 19,548 fans per game.

One bright spot for the Miners in an otherwise dismal season was the play of senior offensive guard Will Hernandez, who was named First Team All-C-USA and would go on to become a second-round draft pick in the 2018 NFL Draft, selected 34th overall by the New York Giants. Hernandez was the second guard taken in his draft class, after only Quenton Nelson.

Schedule
UTEP announced its 2017 football schedule on January 26, 2017. The 2017 schedule consists of 5 home and 7 away games in the regular season. The Miners will host CUSA foes Louisiana Tech, Rice, UTSA, and Western Kentucky (WKU), and will travel to Middle Tennessee, North Texas, Southern Miss, and UAB.

The Miners hosted one of the four non-conference opponents, Arizona from the Pac-12 Conference and travelled to Army who is independent from a conference, New Mexico State from the Sun Belt Conference, and Oklahoma from the Big 12 Conference.

Schedule Source:

Game summaries

at Oklahoma

Rice

Arizona

at New Mexico State

at Army

WKU

at Southern Miss

UTSA

at Middle Tennessee

at North Texas

Louisiana Tech

at UAB

References

UTEP
UTEP Miners football seasons
College football winless seasons
UTEP Miners football